The Great Blizzard of 1888, also known as the Great Blizzard of '88 or the Great White Hurricane (March 11–14, 1888), was one of the most severe recorded blizzards in American history. The storm paralyzed the East Coast from the Chesapeake Bay to Maine, as well as the Atlantic provinces of Canada. Railroads were shut down and people were confined to their homes for up to a week. Railway and telegraph lines were disabled, and this provided the impetus to move these pieces of infrastructure underground. Emergency services were also affected during this blizzard.

Storm details

The weather was unseasonably mild just before the blizzard, with heavy rains that turned to snow as temperatures dropped rapidly. The storm began in earnest shortly after midnight on March 12 and continued unabated for a full day and a half.

Drifts averaged , over the tops of houses from New York to New England, with reports of drifts covering three-story houses.

Impacts
In New York, neither rail nor road transport was possible anywhere for days, and drifts across the New York–New Haven rail line at Westport, Connecticut, took eight days to clear. Transportation gridlock as a result of the storm was partially responsible for the creation of the first underground subway system in the United States, which opened nine years later in Boston.  The New York Stock Exchange was closed for two days. A full two day closure would not occur again until Hurricane Sandy in 2012.

Similarly, telegraph infrastructure was disabled, isolating Montreal and most of the large northeastern U.S. cities from Washington, D.C. to Boston for days.  Following the storm, New York began placing its telegraph and telephone infrastructure underground to prevent their destruction.

Fire stations were immobilized, and property loss from fire alone was estimated at $25 million (equivalent to $ million in ).
The blizzard resulted in the founding of the Christman Bird and Wildlife Sanctuary located near Delanson, New York.

From Chesapeake Bay through the New England area, more than 200 ships were either grounded or wrecked, resulting in the deaths of at least 100 seamen. More than 400 people died from the storm and the ensuing cold, including 200 in New York City alone. Efforts were made to push the snow into the Atlantic Ocean. Severe flooding occurred after the storm due to melting snow, especially in the Brooklyn area, which was susceptible to flooding because of its topography.

Not all areas were notably affected by the Blizzard of 1888; an article in the Cambridge Press published five days after the storm noted that the "fall of snow in this vicinity was comparatively small, and had it not been accompanied by a strong wind it would have been regarded as rather trifling in amount, the total depth, on a level, not exceeding ten inches".

Roscoe Conkling, an influential Republican politician, died as a result of the storm.

On 1 October 1888, an article appeared in the first issue of the National Geographic Society magazine about the great blizzard. It was written by Edward Everett Hayden and described the blizzard and the courageous and successful struggle, told by boat-keeper Robert Robinson, of the crew from the pilot-boat Charles H. Marshall, No. 3.

Pictures

References

Further reading
 
 "The Great Storm of March 11 to 14, 1888", National Geographic Magazine, Vol. 1, No. 1, 1889 (audio) Accessed April 17, 2012

External links

 NOAA: Major winter storms Accessed April 17, 2012
  Blizzard 1888, US Government images Accessed April 17, 2012
 National Snow and Ice Data Center: "Have Snow Shovel, Will Travel" Accessed April 17, 2012
 http://cslib.cdmhost.com/cdm/landingpage/collection/p15019coll17  Connecticut State Library Blizzard of 1888 Photographic Collection

1888-3
Nor'easters
1888 meteorology
1888 natural disasters
1888 in the United States
Natural disasters in Connecticut
Natural disasters in Maryland
Natural disasters in Massachusetts
Natural disasters in New Jersey
Natural disasters in New York (state)
Natural disasters in Pennsylvania
Natural disasters in Washington, D.C.
1888 natural disasters in the United States
1888 in Canada
Natural disasters in Canada
March 1888 events
Natural disasters in Prince Edward Island
Natural disasters in Nova Scotia
Natural disasters in New Brunswick